There are several national anthropological museums. As such, National Museum of Anthropology may refer to:

 National Museum of Anthropology (Manila), in the Philippines
 Museo Nacional de Antropología (MNA), national museum of anthropology in Mexico
 Museo Nacional de Antropología "Dr. David J. Guzmán" (MUNA), national museum of anthropology in El Salvador
 Museo Nacional de Antropología (Madrid), national museum of anthropology in Spain
 Museo Nacional de Arqueología y Etnología (MUNAE), national museum of archaeology, anthropology and ethnology in Guatemala
 Museo Nacional de Arqueología Antropología e Historia del Perú, national museum of archaeology, anthropology and history in Peru 
 Museu Nacional de Antropologia (Angola), Luanda, Angola

See also
 Museum of Archaeology and Anthropology (disambiguation)